Renato Pilipović (born 14 January 1977) is a Croatian retired footballer who played as a midfielder. He is currently working as an assistant manager of the Croatia national under-21 team.

Career
He was also capped for Croatia once at full international level in a friendly against Mexico in June 1999 and was a member of the Croatia under-21 squad which competed at the 2000 European Championship.

Career statistics

Honours
Rijeka
Prva HNL
Runners-up (1): 1998-99

Dinamo Zagreb
Prva HNL
Winner (1): 1999-00
Runners-up (1): 2000-01
Croatian Cup
Winner (2): 2000-01, 2001-02
Runners-up (1): 1999-00

Croatia Sesvete
Druga HNL
Winner (1): 2007-08

References

External links

1977 births
Living people
Footballers from Rijeka
Association football midfielders
Croatian footballers
Croatia international footballers
Croatia under-21 international footballers
HNK Rijeka players
GNK Dinamo Zagreb players
FC Kärnten players
NK Zagreb players
NK Istra 1961 players
NK Croatia Sesvete players
Croatian Football League players
2. Liga (Austria) players
First Football League (Croatia) players
Croatian expatriate footballers
Expatriate footballers in Austria
Croatian expatriate sportspeople in Austria
HNK Rijeka non-playing staff